Lissonotypus is a genus of beetles in the family Cerambycidae, containing the following species:

 Lissonotypus brasiliensis (Buquet, 1860)
 Lissonotypus tetraspilotus (White, 1853)

References

Trachyderini
Cerambycidae genera